Carlos Fernando Sousa Monteiro (born 14 December 1965) is a Portuguese long-distance runner. He competed in the men's 5000 metres at the 1992 Summer Olympics.

References

1965 births
Living people
Athletes (track and field) at the 1992 Summer Olympics
Portuguese male long-distance runners
Olympic athletes of Portugal